Mickey's Delayed Date is a cartoon produced by Walt Disney Productions, distributed by RKO Radio Pictures and released on October 3, 1947. The film was directed by Charles Nichols and was animated by Jerry Hathcock, George Kreisl, George Nicholas, Harry Holt, Bob Youngquist, Marvin Woodward, and Max Cox with effects animation by Jack Boyd and Andy Engman. It was the 120th short in the Mickey Mouse film series to be released, and the only one produced that year.

It was the last Mickey Mouse cartoon featuring Walt Disney as Mickey Mouse.

Plot
Minnie Mouse is calling Mickey to remind him about their date, which he has totally forgotten about while sleeping on the couch. With the help of Pluto, Mickey gets dressed for the date, but loses the tickets to the show on his way out the door. Pluto takes the tickets to Mickey, after his tuxedo has been ruined by water from a passing car, and then Minnie arrives and tells him he has a cute costume for the "hard times" costume party.

Voice cast
 Mickey Mouse: Walt Disney
 Minnie Mouse: Leone Ledoux
 Pluto: Jimmy MacDonald

Releases
1947 – theatrical release
1978 – "Mickey Mouse Jubilee Show" (TV)
c. 1983 – Good Morning, Mickey!, episode #20 (TV)
c. 1992 – Mickey's Mouse Tracks, episode #75 (TV)
2010 – Have a Laugh!, episode #9 (TV)

Home media
The short was released on May 18, 2004, on Walt Disney Treasures: Mickey Mouse in Living Color, Volume Two: 1939-Today.

Additional releases include:
1984 – "Cartoon Classics - Limited Gold Edition: Minnie" (VHS)
1995 – "Love Tales" (VHS)
2004 – "Mickey and Minnie's Sweetheart Stories" (DVD)
2006 – "Classic Cartoons Favorites: Best Pals - Mickey and Minnie" (DVD)
2011 – "Have a Laugh! Volume Three" (DVD)
2023 – Mickey & Minnie: 10 Classic Shorts - Volume 1 (Blu-ray/DVD/Digital)

See also
Mickey Mouse (film series)

References

External links

1940s Disney animated short films
Mickey Mouse short films
Pluto (Disney) short films
1947 animated films
1940s English-language films
Films produced by Walt Disney
Films scored by Oliver Wallace
Films directed by Charles August Nichols
American animated short films
RKO Pictures short films
RKO Pictures animated short films
Animated films about mice
Animated films about dogs